Somatidia picticornis is a species of beetle in the family Cerambycidae. It was described by Broun in 1895.

References

picticornis
Beetles described in 1895